Vice-Admiral Sir Charles George Frederick Knowles, 4th Baronet (14 March 1832 – 3 March 1917) was an officer of the Royal Navy, who saw service during the Second Burmese War and in command on the Niger expedition and quelling uprising at Santa Cruz, eventually rising to the rank of vice-admiral.

Family and early life
This family is descended from Charles Knollys, titular 4th Earl of Banbury temp James II. Knowles was born on 14 March 1832 at Vaynor Park, Berriew, Montgomeryshire, Wales, the son of Sir Francis Charles Knowles 3rd Baronet and his wife Emma Pocock, daughter of Sir George Pocock, 2nd Baronet. He was the fourth of his line since his great grandfather, Sir Charles Knowles, admiral, was created a baronet for purely naval services in 1765. His grandfather, Sir Charles Knowles, followed his own father's career, rising to Admiral, though his son, Knowles' father Sir Francis Charles Knowles, discarded a life in the service to devote himself to the pursuit of science, and succeeded in attaining to the blue ribbon of the scientific world - a fellowship of the Royal Society in 1830. On the maternal side also, Knowles had a very distinguished naval pedigree, for his mother was the granddaughter of Admiral Sir George Pocock, the victor of the Havanna, who had been shipmate with the first Sir Charles Knowles whilst midshipmen at the defeat of the Spanish fleet at Cape Pissaro 1718, commanded by his kinsman, Admiral Lord Torrington. It was into a century of general peace that the third admiral of his line was to pursue a more peaceful naval career than that of his forebears. With a fleet larger than any two rivals combined, there were to be no major battles fought, just localised military action buttressed by the Royal Navy.

Naval Service
Knowles joined the navy on 21 May 1845 at the age of fourteen as midshipman and served as a naval cadet in HMS Queen from 21 May 1845 – 22 August 1846, HMS Constance from 23 August 1846 – 8 December 1849 and the sloop HMS Contest from 9 Dec 1849 – 21 May 1851 when appointed acting mate whilst in Shanghai, aged twenty, six years since joining, and mate 21 May 1851;
He was promoted an acting lieutenant in a death vacancy in HMS Fox on 8 Oct 1852 under the command of Commodore (later Ad SIr ) George Lambert during the latter part of the Second Anglo-Burmese war of 5 April 1852 – 20 December 1852; Burmese Medal;

He was appointed Lieutenant 7 February 1853; serving in the East Indies, joining HMS Wolverene at Chatham 17 June 1854 – 26 Nov 1855; HMS Sappho on the west coast of Africa 22 January 1856 – 10 March 1856 when discharged from hospital; HMS Raven as Lt Commander 20 March 1856 – 17 May 1856;  on the west coast of Africa 18 May 1856 – 15 Sept 1857; HMS Archer at Woolwich 21 May 1858 – 9 June 1859; He received the thanks of the admiralty for the salvage of HMS Ardent when stranded on the west coast of Africa in 1858; HMS Royal Adelaide at Devenport 6 April – 25 June 1860, HMS Terrible in the mediterranean 26 June 1860 – 20 May 1861, HMS St Vincent a 120 gun first rate ship of the line used as a training ship at Portsmouth 27 August 1861 – 20 January 1864;

 Command of a "gunboat" in the nineteenth century provided valuable experience for the Royal Navy's junior officers and he was put in command of HMS Investigator, a 149-ton wooden paddle survey vessel with two gun armament launched 16 November 1861, in the ascent of the Niger of August–October 1864; to meet with the explorer Dr William Balfour Baikie and was invalided from Ascension Island 1864; He kept a detailed journal in which he recorded the places visited, a study of the people met and a narrative of the voyage. A resume was published in the Royal Geographical Society Journal in January 1865 and Part of  "The Journal of Lieutenant Charles Knowles in the river Niger, 1864" published in The Naval Miscellany; On 1 March 1865 he was appointed Commander, and on 11 Sept 1865 he was appointed Inspecting Commander of the South Yarmouth Division of the Coastguard in HMS Irresistible.

He gained the thanks of the admiralty dated 4 April 1872 for service on the coast of Cuba during the Cuban insurrection of 1870–71, and received the thanks dated 31 May 1873 of the Colonial Service for fishery service off the coast of Newfoundland when in command of the Lapwing.

Family and issue
Knowles married firstly Elizabeth Chapman in 1861 and had two sons and three daughters. He married secondly Mary Ellen Thomson on 11 June 1882, the grand daughter of the Hon Joseph Howe, Lt Gov of Nova Scotia. They had three sons and two daughters. He succeeded to the baronetcy on the death of his father in 1892 and died aged 87 at Oxford on 3 March 1917 and is buried at Ryde on the Isle of Wight. He was succeeded as baronet by his eldest son from the second marriage, Francis Knowles.

See also
 Knowles Baronets

Notes

References
The Illustrated London News, Sat 24 February 1866
Debrett's Peerage and Baronetage 1995
Naval Miscellany Vol 7

Royal Navy vice admirals
Charles
Baronets in the Baronetage of Great Britain
1765 establishments in Great Britain
1832 births
1917 deaths